Cronenberg is a surname. Notable people with the surname include:

Brandon Cronenberg (born 1980), Canadian writer and film director; son of David Cronenberg
Carl-Julius Cronenberg (born 1962), German politician
Caitlin Cronenberg (born 1984), Canadian photographer and director; daughter of David Cronenberg
David Cronenberg (born 1943), Canadian filmmaker, screenwriter and actor
Denise Cronenberg (1938–2020), Canadian costume designer

See also
Kronenberg (surname)

German-language surnames
Jewish surnames
Yiddish-language surnames